George Tyree Fleming (June 29, 1938 – December 6, 2021) was an American politician and professional football player. A multi-positional player, he played college football for the Washington Huskies. Fleming was a member of AAWU champion 1959 and 1960 Washington Huskies football teams, playing in the 1960 and 1961 Rose Bowls. He earned second-team All-Coast halfback and Co-Player of the Game honors after the Huskies' win in 1960 Rose Bowl. For his contribution to the Rose Bowl game, he was inducted into the Rose Bowl Hall of Fame on December 31, 2011.

In 1968, Fleming entered a career in Washington state politics, including two years in the state House of Representatives and 20 in the Senate. He retired after the 1990 session.

Fleming died at his Seattle home on December 6, 2021, at the age of 83.

See also

 Washington Huskies football statistical leaders

References

External links
 Player Bio: George Fleming - University of Washington Official Athletics Site - Washington Official Site
 Stats at ProFootballReference

1938 births
2021 deaths
African-American state legislators in Washington (state)
American athlete-politicians
Democratic Party members of the Washington House of Representatives
Democratic Party Washington (state) state senators
Washington Huskies football players
Oakland Raiders players
Winnipeg Blue Bombers players
21st-century African-American people
20th-century African-American people